Chiheru railway station a railway station on Ambala–Attari line under Firozpur railway division of Northern Railway zone. This is situated beside National Highway 44 at Chiheru, Tehsil Phagwara in Kapurthala district in the Indian state of Punjab.

History
Amritsar–Attari line was completed in 1862. the electrification of the line was completed in different period. Shahbad Markanda-Mandi Gobindgarh sector was electrified in 1995–96, the Mandi Gobindgarh–Ludhiana sector in 1996–97, the Phillaur–Phagwara sector in 2002–03, and the Phagwara–Jallandhar City–Amritsar in 2003–04.

References 

Railway stations in Kapurthala district
Firozpur railway division
Railway stations opened in 1862